Hydraecia nordstroemi is a moth belonging to the family Noctuidae. The species was first described by Arvid Horke in 1952.

It is native to Europe.

References

Apameini